A street circuit is a motorsport racing circuit composed of temporarily closed-off public roads of a city, town or village, used in motor races. Airport runways and taxiways are also sometimes part of street circuits. Facilities such as the paddock, pit boxes, fences and grandstands are usually installed temporarily and removed soon after the race is over but in modern times the pits, garages, race control and main grandstands are sometimes permanently constructed in the area. Since the track surface is originally planned for normal speeds, race drivers often find street circuits bumpy and lacking grip. Run-off areas may be non-existent, which makes driving mistakes more expensive than in purpose-built circuits with wider run-off areas.
Racing on a street circuit is also called "legal street racing".

Local governments sometimes support races held in street circuits to promote tourism. In some cases, short segments or connector roads of the circuit are purpose-built for the racecourse, and remain in place year-round, but are not otherwise utilized by public traffic.

List of street circuits
active circuits in bold

Americas

Baltimore, Maryland, USA (IndyCar, ALMS)
Brooklyn, New York, USA (Formula E)
Buenos Aires Puerto Madero, Argentina (Formula E)
 Buenos Aires TC2000, Argentina (TC2000)
Carrera Panamericana, Mexico (WSC)
Chicago Street Course, Illinois, USA (NASCAR)
Dallas, Texas, USA (F1)
Denver, Colorado, USA (CART)
Detroit Belle Isle Park, Michigan, USA (CART, IndyCar, ALMS)
Detroit Renaissance Center, Michigan, USA (F1, CART)
Halifax, Canada (British F2, IMSA)
Houston, Texas, USA (CART, IndyCar, ALMS)
Las Vegas, Nevada, USA (CART)
Long Beach, California, USA (F1, CART, IndyCar, ALMS, SCC, Formula E)
Miami Bayfront Park, Florida, USA (CART, IMSA, ALMS)
Miami Bicentennial Park, Florida, USA (CART, IMSA)
Miami Biscayne Bay, Florida, USA (CART, IMSA)
Monterrey, Mexico (CART, A1 GP)
Montreal, Canada (Formula E)
Montevideo, Uruguay (Top Race, AUVo)
Nashville, Tennessee, USA (IndyCar)
Pittsburgh, Pennsylvania, USA (SCCA)
Phoenix, Arizona, USA (F1)
Piriápolis, Uruguay (F3 Sudamericana, AUVo)
Potrero de los Funes, Argentina (TC 2000, Turismo Carretera, FIA GT)
Punta del Este, Uruguay (TC 2000, AUVo, Formula E)
Ribeirão Preto, Brazil (Brazilian Stock Car)
Salvador, Brazil (Brazilian Stock Car)
San Jose, California, USA (CART)
Santa Fe, Argentina (TC 2000, F3 Sudamericana)
Santiago Parque Forestal, Chile (Formula E)
Santiago Parque O'Higgins, Chile (Formula E)
São Paulo, Brazil (IndyCar)
St. Petersburg, Florida, USA (CART, IndyCar, ALMS)
Toronto, Canada (CART, IndyCar)
Trois-Rivières, Canada (ALMS, Grand-Am, NASCAR)
Vancouver, Canada (CART, Formula E)

Asia

Bangsaen, Thailand (Bangsaen Grand Prix)
Beijing Jingkai, China (A1GP)
Beijing Olympic Green, China (Formula E)
Beijing SC, China (Superleague Formula)
Changwon, South Korea (F3)
Hong Kong Central, Hong Kong (Formula E)
Hyderabad, India (F4)
Jakarta, Indonesia (Formula E)
Jeddah, Saudi Arabia (F1, F2)
Kuala Lumpur, Malaysia (V8 Supercars)
Macau Guia, Macau (Macau Grand Prix: F3, GT3, WTCR, Superbike)
Malacca, Malaysia
Mandalika, Indonesia (MotoGP, Superbike)
Marina Bay, Singapore (F1)
Riyadh, Saudi Arabia (Formula E)
Putrajaya, Malaysia (Formula E)
Sanya, China (Formula E)
Seoul Street Circuit, South Korea (Formula E)
Seremban, Malaysia
Shanghai, China (DTM)
SPICE, Penang,  Malaysia
Tangerang, Indonesia (A1GP)
Thomson Road, Singapore
Wuhan, China (WTCR)
Zhuhai, China (BPR GT)

Europe and Africa

Ain-Diab, Morocco 
Aix-les-Bains Circuit du Lac, France
Alemannenring, Germany (DTM)*
Baku, Azerbaijan (F1)
Baku World Challenge, Azerbaijan (FIA GT)
Barcelona Montjuïc, Spain (F1, MotoGP)
Barcelona Pedralbes, Spain (F1)
Berlin Karl-Marx Allee, Germany (Formula E)
Berlin Tempelhof, Germany (Formula E)
Bern, Switzerland (Formula E)
Bilbao, Spain (World Series by Renault)
Billown Circuit, Isle of Man
Birmingham, England, UK (F3000, BTCC)
Boavista, Portugal (F1, WTCC)
Boyne 100, Ireland
Bucharest, Romania (FIA GT, British F3)
Cagliari, Italy (Euro F3000)
Circuit de Chimay, Belgium
Circuit Paalgraven, Netherlands
Clady Circuit, Northern Ireland, UK
Clypse Course, Isle of Man
Dundrod Circuit, Northern Ireland, UK
Durban, South Africa (A1GP)
Four Inch Course, Isle of Man
Frohburger Dreieck, Germany
Geneva, Switzerland
Göteborg City Race, Sweden  (STCC)
Helsinki Thunder, Finland (FIA GT, F3000, DTM)
Highroads Course, Isle of Man
Horice Road Racing Circuit, Czech Republic
Imatra Circuit, Finland (Motorcycle races)
Killalane Road Races, Ireland
Circuito Lasarte, Spain (Grand Prix)
La Bañeza, Spain (Classic motorbikes, 125GP, Moto3)
Le Mans, France (WEC)
London Battersea Park, England, UK (Formula E)
London ExCel Arena, England, UK (Formula E)
Marrakech, Morocco (WTCR, Auto GP, Formula E)
Masaryk street circuit, Czech Republic (GP, ETCC, MotoGP)
Mille Miglia, Italy (WSC)
Monaco, Montecarlo (F1, F2, Formula E, FREC)
Moscow, Russia (Formula E)
Nikola Tesla Belgrade, Serbia (Belgrade24h promo race 2010, Serbian National Championship)
Noordzee omloop, Belgium
Nuremberg, Germany (DTM)
North West 200, Northern Ireland, UK
Oliver's Mount, England, UK
Opatija, Croatia
Paris, France (Formula E)
Pau, France (F3, WTCC, WTCR, Euroformula Open)
Palanga, Lithuania
Pirita-Kose-Kloostrimetsa Circuit, Estonia
Rome EUR, Italy (Formula E)
Seinäjoki Vauhtiajot Circuit, Finland
Skerries Road Racing Circuit, Ireland
Snaefell Mountain Course, Isle of Man
Solitude Racetrack, Germany (Motorcycle races)
St John's Short Course, Isle of Man
Tandragee 100 Road Race Circuit, Ireland
Těrlický okruh, Czech Republic
Tolbert, Netherlands
Targa Florio, Italy (WSC)
Tripoli, Libya
Valencia, Spain (F1, Spanish F3, International GT Open)
Varsselring, Netherlands
Vila Real, Portugal (WTCC, WTCR)
Zurich, Switzerland (Formula E)

Oceania

Adelaide, Australia (F1, ALMS, Supercars)
Bathurst, Australia (Supercars)
Canberra, Australia (Supercars)
Dunedin, New Zealand
Gold Coast, Australia (CART, Supercars)
Hamilton, New Zealand (Supercars, Toyota Racing Series)
Melbourne, Australia (F1, Supercars)
Newcastle, Australia (Supercars)
Paeroa, New Zealand
Sydney Olympic Park, Australia (Supercars)
Townsville, Australia (Supercars)
Wanganui, New Zealand (Boxing Day Motorbike Races)
Wellington, New Zealand (Touring Cars)

Never used
Hanoi Street Circuit, Vietnam (planned for F1 in 2020, cancelled due to the COVID-19 pandemic, later abandoned in 2021)
Port Imperial Street Circuit, New Jersey, USA (proposed for F1 in 2013, abandoned as of 2016)

See also
Figure 8 racing
Open Road Racing
Oval track racing
Motorcycle Road Racing

Footnotes

References

Motorsport venues